State Road 547 (NM 547) is a  state highway in the US state of New Mexico. NM 547's northern terminus is at Cibola Forest Road 193, and the southern terminus is at NM 122 and Historic US 66 (West Santa Fe Avenue) in Grants.

Major intersections

See also

References

547
Transportation in Cibola County, New Mexico